The North Suburban Conference was a Minnesota State High School League recognized high school extracurricular conference including 11 schools located in the northern suburbs of the Twin Cities. The conference disbanded following the 2013-14 school year, after Chisago Lakes, St. Francis, and North Branch announced they would join the Mississippi 8 Conference and Robbinsdale Cooper and St. Louis Park left for the Metro West Conference.

Schools as of 2013-14
 Benilde-St. Margaret's Red Knights - Benilde-St. Margaret's School
 Chisago Lakes Wildcats - Chisago Lakes High School
 Columbia Heights Hylanders - Columbia Heights High School
 Fridley Tigers - Fridley High School
 Irondale Knights - Irondale High School
 North Branch Vikings - North Branch Area High School
 Robbinsdale Cooper Hawks - Robbinsdale Cooper High School
 Spring Lake Park Panthers - Spring Lake Park High School
 St. Francis Fighting Saints - St. Francis High School
 St. Louis Park Orioles - Saint Louis Park High School
 Totino-Grace Eagles - Totino-Grace High School

Former members

 Buffalo Bison - Buffalo High School
 Cambridge-Isanti Bluejackets - Cambridge-Isanti High School
 Centennial Cougars - Centennial High School
 Monticello Magic - Monticello High School
 Coon Rapids Cardinal - Coon Rapids High School
 Anoka Tornadoes - Anoka High School
 Blaine Bengals - Blaine High School
 Ramsey Rams - Alexander Ramsey High School (closed in 1986)?
 Kellogg Lancers - Frank B. Kellogg High School (closed in 1986)
 Mounds View Mustangs- Mounds View High School
 Elk River Elks- Elk River High School

References

Minnesota high school sports conferences